R. Thyagarajan (died 1 July 2018) was an Indian writer, producer and director who worked in Tamil cinema.

Film career 
Thyagarajan grew up in Pollachi in an extended family of 23 people, and had four sisters and four brothers. After studying in Pollachi, he went on to study chemistry in Peelamedu, with the intention of becoming a chemist. After his marriage in 1966, he began to work on the productions of his father-in-law, Sandow M. M. A. Chinnappa Thevar of Devar Films. He initially worked on the story-discussion panel teams in 1968 and progressed to the editing department. In the late 1960s, he worked as an assistant director and as an associate editor in the films, Haathi Mere Saathi (1971) and Nalla Neram (1972).

His first directorial venture was Vellikizhamai Viratham (1974), which portrayed the bond between the female protagonist and her deity, the Naga-Devatha. The film starring Sivakumar, performed well at the box office and was later remade in Hindi and Telugu. Over the course of his career, he was closely associated with Devar Films, eventually going on to make over 30 films. He made 11 films with Rajinikanth in the lead role, including the Tamil-Telugu bilinguals Annai Oru Aalayam (1979) and Anbukku Naan Adimai (1980), the crime drama Ranga (1982), and the Hindi film Bewafai (1985). Several of the films produced under the Devar Films banner featured animals such as lions, snakes and elephants in pivotal scenes, and Thyagarajan became renowned for handling the shoot.

Personal life 
In 1966, Thyagarajan married T. Subbulakshmi. He subsequently became the son-in-law of producer Sandow M. M. A. Chinnappa Thevar of Devar Films. He had two children, son Vel Muruga and daughter Shanmugha Vadivu.

Death 
Thyagarajan died on 1 July 2018 following a heart attack.

Partial filmography 
Director

References

External links 

2018 deaths
Year of birth missing
20th-century Indian dramatists and playwrights
Film directors from Tamil Nadu
Tamil film directors
Tamil screenwriters